Copeland is a surname. Notable people with the surname include:

 Aaron Copland (1900–1990), American composer
 Adam Copeland (born 1973), Canadian professional wrestler
 Al Copeland (1944–2008), American restaurateur
 Anthony Copeland (born 1963), American football player
 Billy Copeland (1856–1917), Scottish cricketer
 Brian Copeland (born 1964), American comedian
 Chad Copeland (born 1971), American basketball player
 Charles L. Copeland (born 1963), American politician
 Charlie Copeland (footballer), (1892–1939), English footballer
 Chris Copeland (born 1984), American basketball player
 David Copeland (footballer) (1875–1931), English footballer
 David Y. Copeland III (1931–2019), American politician
 Edmund Copeland, British cosmologist
 Edward Copeland (disambiguation), multiple people
 Edwin Copeland (1873–1964), American botanist
 George Copeland (1882–1971), American pianist
 Gordon Copeland (1943–2018), New Zealand politician
 Herbert Copeland (1902–1968), American biologist
 Hollis Copeland (born 1955), American basketball player
 Howard Copeland (1944–2019), American lawyer and politician
 Ian Copeland (1949–2006), American talent agent
 Ida Copeland (1876–1964), British politician
 Ivy Copeland (1888–1961), New Zealand artist and art teacher
 J. William Copeland (1914–1988), associate justice of the North Carolina Supreme Court
 Jack Copeland (born 1950), British philosopher
 James Copeland (disambiguation), multiple people
 Jeremaine Copeland (born 1977), Canadian football player
 Jim Copeland (American football) (1945–2010), American football player
 Joan Copeland (1922–2022), American actress
 John Copeland (born 1970), American football player
 John Anthony Copeland Jr. (1834–1859), American abolitionist
 Johnny Copeland (1937–1997), American blues singer and guitarist
 Joseph T. Copeland (1813–1893), associate justice of the Michigan Supreme Court
 Katherine Copeland (born 1990), British rower
 Kenneth Copeland (born 1936), American televangelist
 Lanard Copeland (born 1965), Australian-American basketball player and coach
 Les C. Copeland (1887–1942) American composer and pianist
 Lillian Copeland (1904–1964), American Olympic discus champion; set world records in discus, javelin, and shot put
 Lorraine Copeland (1921–2013), British archaeologist
 Martha Copeland (c. 1891-1894–unknown), American classic female blues singer
 Marquise Copeland (born 1997), American football player
 Miles Copeland (disambiguation), multiple people
 Misty Copeland (born 1982), American ballet dancer
 Robert Copeland (disambiguation), multiple people
 Royal Copeland, multiple people
 Russell Copeland (born 1971), American football player
 Scott Copeland (born 1987), American baseball player
 Shemekia Copeland (born 1979), American blues singer
 Stewart Copeland (born 1952), American musician
 Ted Copeland, English football coach
 Thomas Copeland (1781–1855), British surgeon
 Thomas Copeland (schoolmaster) (1437–??), English schoolmaster
 Tom Copeland (born 1924), American politician
 Trent Copeland (born 1986), Australian cricketer
 William Copeland (disambiguation), multiple people

Fictional characters
 Dominic Copeland, a fictional character in the British medical drama] Holby City
 Joseph Copeland, a fictional character in the anime Gundam SEED DESTINY
 Kevin & Marcus Copeland, fictional characters in the movie White Chicks
 Mark Copeland, a recurring fictional character in the video game Days Gone

See also 
 William Copeland Borlase
 Copeland (disambiguation)
 Copland (disambiguation)

References

Surnames
English-language surnames
Surnames of English origin
Surnames of British Isles origin